Glenn Warren "Swampy" Brydson (November 7, 1910 — December 9, 1993) was a Canadian ice hockey right winger who played eight seasons in the National Hockey League (NHL) for the Montreal Maroons, St. Louis Eagles, New York Rangers and Chicago Black Hawks between 1930 and 1938. After leaving the NHL Brydson played five seasons seasons were spent in the International American Hockey League, which became the American Hockey League, where he played for the New Haven Eagles, Indianapolis Capitals, Springfield Indians, and Pittsburgh Hornets. After briefly playing senior hockey, he retired in 1942.

Brydson is interred at Park Lawn Cemetery in Toronto.

Career statistics

Regular season and playoffs

References

External links

1910 births
1993 deaths
Canadian ice hockey right wingers
Chicago Blackhawks players
Indianapolis Capitals players
Montreal Maroons players
New Haven Eagles players
New York Rangers players
Pittsburgh Hornets players
St. Louis Eagles players
Ice hockey people from Toronto
Springfield Indians players
20th-century Canadian people